Encephalartos altensteinii is a palm-like cycad in the family Zamiaceae. It is endemic to South Africa. The species name altensteinii commemorates Altenstein, a 19th-century German chancellor and patron of science. It is commonly known as the breadtree, broodboom, Eastern Cape giant cycad or uJobane (Zulu). It is listed as vulnerable due to habitat destruction, use for traditional medicine and removal by collectors.

Description

This cycad grows up to seven metres tall and may be branched or unbranched. The leaves are straight or curved backwards and up to three metres in length. The leaflets are rigid and fairly broad with one or both margins toothed. There are no prickles at the base of the leaf which distinguishes it from E. natalensis. There are usually two to five greenish-yellow cones up to fifty centimetres long, the female scales covered with protuberances. The cones are poisonous to humans. The seeds are scarlet and up to four centimetres long.

Distribution and habitat
This species is widespread in the Eastern Cape and south-western KwaZulu-Natal provinces of South Africa. It favours sites near the coast including open scrub, steep rocky slopes, evergreen forests in valleys and river banks. It also occurs inland at a higher altitude in isolated sites in the Amatola Mountains.

References

External links
 

altensteinii
Flora of the Cape Provinces
Plants used in traditional African medicine